Separate reality and similar can mean:
Separate Reality (climbing route) in Yosemite National Park, California
A Separate Reality, a 1971 book by Carlos Castaneda

See also
Parallel universe (disambiguation)